The Little Pirate is a 1917 American silent family adventure film directed by Elsie Jane Wilson and starring Zoe Rae, Charles West and Frank Brownlee.

Cast
 Zoe Rae as Margery
 Charles West as George Drake
 Frank Brownlee as John Baird
 Gretchen Lederer as Virginia Baird
 Frederick Titus as Butler
 Lillian Peacock as Maid
 Burwell Hamrick as Captain Kidd Jr.

References

Bibliography
 Robert B. Connelly. The Silents: Silent Feature Films, 1910-36, Volume 40, Issue 2. December Press, 1998.

External links
 

1917 films
1917 adventure films
American silent feature films
American adventure films
American black-and-white films
Universal Pictures films
Films directed by Elsie Jane Wilson
1910s English-language films
1910s American films
Silent adventure films